Hal Wantland (July 9, 1944 – April 8, 2008) was an American football defensive back. He played for the Miami Dolphins in 1966.

He died on April 8, 2008, in Knoxville, Tennessee at age 63.

References

1944 births
2008 deaths
American football defensive backs
Tennessee Volunteers football players
Miami Dolphins players